Edward Morgan  was an Irish Anglican priest in the  17th century.

Morgan was Treasurer of Ardfert Cathedral from 1664 to 1669;  and Archdeacon of Ardfert from 1669 to 1676.

References

17th-century Irish Anglican priests
Archdeacons of Ardfert